Big Bill Broonzy (born Lee Conley Bradley; June 26, 1903 – August 14, 1958) was an American blues singer, songwriter, and guitarist. His career began in the 1920s, when he played country music to mostly African American audiences. In the 1930s and 1940s, he navigated a change in style to a more urban blues sound popular with working-class black audiences. In the 1950s, a return to his traditional folk-blues roots made him one of the leading figures of the emerging American folk music revival and an international star. His long and varied career marks him as one of the key figures in the development of blues music in the 20th century.

Broonzy copyrighted more than 300 songs, including adaptations of traditional folk songs and original blues songs. As a blues composer, he was unique in writing songs that reflected his rural-to-urban experiences.

Life and career

Early years
Born Lee Conley Bradley, he was one of the 17 children of Frank Broonzy (Bradley) and Mittie Belcher. The date and place of his birth are disputed. Broonzy claimed to have been born in Scott, Mississippi, but a body of emerging research compiled by the blues historian Robert Reisman suggests that he was born in Jefferson County, Arkansas. Broonzy claimed he was born in 1893, and many sources report that year, but family records discovered after his death suggested that the year was 1903. Soon after his birth the family moved to an area called Lake Dick, Arkansas, near Pine Bluff, Arkansas, where Bill spent his youth. He began playing music at an early age. At the age of 10 he made himself a fiddle from a cigar box and learned how to play spirituals and folk songs from his uncle, Jerry Belcher. He and a friend, Louis Carter, who played a homemade guitar, began performing at social and church functions. These early performances included playing at "two-stages": picnics where whites and blacks danced at the same event, but with different stages for blacks and whites.

On the understanding that he was born in 1898 rather than earlier or later, sources suggest that in 1915, 17-year-old Broonzy was married and working as a sharecropper. He had given up playing the fiddle and had become a preacher. There is a story that he was offered $50 and a new violin if he would play for four days at a local venue. Before he could respond to the offer, his wife took the money and spent it, so he had to play.

It has been previously stated that in 1916 his crop and stock were wiped out by drought and he went to work locally until he was drafted into the Army in 1917, that he served for two years in Europe during the First World War and that after his discharge from the Army in 1919, he left Pine Bluff and moved to the Little Rock area.  However, biographer Bob Riesman, after examining Broonzy's family records, census records and local draft cards, concluded that Broonzy was only 14 in 1917 when the U.S. entered WW I and that Broonzy never actually served in the Army during World War I.  In 1920, Broonzy moved north to Chicago in search of opportunity.

1920s
After arriving in Chicago, Broonzy switched from fiddle to guitar. He learned to play the guitar from the veteran minstrel and medicine show performer Papa Charlie Jackson, who began recording for Paramount Records in 1924. Through the 1920s Broonzy worked at a string of odd jobs, including Pullman porter, cook, foundry worker and custodian, to supplement his income, but his main interest was music. He played regularly at rent parties and social gatherings, steadily improving his guitar playing. During this time he wrote one of his signature tunes, a solo guitar piece called "Saturday Night Rub".

Thanks to his association with Jackson, Broonzy was able to get an audition with Paramount executive J. Mayo Williams. His initial test recordings, made with his friend John Thomas on vocals, were rejected, but Broonzy persisted, and his second try, a few months later, was more successful. His first record, "Big Bill's Blues", backed with "House Rent Stomp", credited to Big Bill and Thomps (Paramount 12656), was released in 1927. Although the recording was not well received, Paramount retained its new talent and in the next few years released more records by Big Bill and Thomas. The records sold poorly. Reviewers considered his style immature and derivative.

1930s
In 1930, Paramount for the first time used Broonzy's full name on a recording, "Station Blues" – albeit misspelled as "Big Bill Broomsley". Record sales continued to be poor, and Broonzy was working at a grocery store. He was picked up by Lester Melrose, who produced musical acts for various labels, including Champion Records and Gennett Records.
Harum Scarums, a trio comprising Broonzy, Georgia Tom and Mozelle Alderson, recorded the two-part "Alabama Scratch" in Grafton, Wisconsin, for Paramount Records (Paramount 13054) in January 1931, and it was reported that it sounded "as if it was a real party". Broonzy recorded several sides released in the spring of 1931 under the name Big Bill Johnson. In March 1932 he traveled to New York City and began recording for the American Record Corporation on their line of less expensive labels (Melotone Records, Perfect Records and others). These recordings sold better, and Broonzy was becoming better known. Back in Chicago he was working regularly in South Side clubs, and he toured with Memphis Minnie.

In 1934 Broonzy moved to RCA Victor's subsidiary Bluebird Records and began recording with the pianist known as "Black Bob." With Black Bob his music was evolving to a stronger R&B sound, and his singing sounded more assured and personal. In 1937, he began playing with the pianist Joshua Altheimer, recording and performing with a small instrumental group, including "traps" (drums), double bass and one or more melody instruments (horns or harmonica or both). In March 1938 he began recording for Vocalion Records.

Broonzy's reputation grew. In 1938 he was asked to fill in for the recently deceased Robert Johnson at the "From Spirituals to Swing" concert at Carnegie Hall, produced by John H. Hammond. He also appeared in the 1939 concert at the same venue. His success led him in the same year to a small role in Swingin' the Dream, Gilbert Seldes's jazz adaptation of Shakespeare's Midsummer Night's Dream, set in New Orleans in 1890 and featuring, among others, Louis Armstrong as Bottom and Maxine Sullivan as Titania, with the Benny Goodman sextet.

Broonzy's recorded output through the 1930s only partially reflects his importance to Chicago blues. His half-brother, Washboard Sam, and his friends Jazz Gillum and Tampa Red, also recorded for Bluebird. Broonzy was credited as the composer of many of their most popular recordings of that time. He reportedly played guitar on most of Washboard Sam's tracks. Because of his exclusive arrangements with his record label, Broonzy was careful to allow his name to appear on these artists' records only as a composer.

1940s
Broonzy expanded his work during the 1940s as he honed his songwriting skills, which showed a knack for appealing to his more sophisticated city audience as well as people that shared his country roots. His work in this period shows he performed across a wider musical spectrum than almost any other bluesman before or since, including in his repertoire ragtime, hokum blues, country blues, urban blues, jazz-tinged songs, folk songs and spirituals. After World War II, Broonzy recorded songs that were the bridge that allowed many younger musicians to cross over to the future of the blues: the electric blues of postwar Chicago. His 1945 recordings of "Where the Blues Began", with Big Maceo on piano and Buster Bennett on sax, and "Martha Blues", with Memphis Slim on piano, clearly showed the way forward. One of his best-known songs, "Key to the Highway", appeared at this time. When the second American Federation of Musicians strike ended in 1948, Broonzy was signed by Mercury Records.

In 1949, Broonzy became part of a touring folk music revue, I Come for to Sing, formed by Win Stracke, which also included Studs Terkel and Lawrence Lane. Terkel called him the key figure in the group. The revue had some success thanks to the emerging folk revival. When the revue played at Iowa State University in Ames, Broonzy met a local couple, Leonard and Lillian Feinberg, who found him a custodial job at Iowa State when a doctor ordered Broonzy to discontinue touring later that year. He remained in Ames until 1951, when he resumed touring.

1950s

He left Chicago in 1950 to work as a janitor at Iowa State, having performed there and established relationships with a likely view to develop his own influence and craft. After his return to performing, the exposure from I Come for to Sing made it possible for Broonzy to tour Europe in 1951. Here he was greeted with standing ovations and critical praise wherever he played. The tour marked a turning point in his fortunes, and when he returned to the United States he was a featured act with many prominent folk artists, such as Pete Seeger, and Sonny Terry and Brownie McGhee. From 1953 on, his financial position became more secure, and he was able to live well on his earnings from music. He returned to his solo folk-blues roots and travelled and recorded extensively. Broonzy's numerous performances during the 1950s in British folk and jazz clubs were a significant influence on British audiences' understanding of the blues and bolstered the nascent British folk revival and early blues scene. Many British musicians on the folk scene, such as Bert Jansch, cited him as an important influence. John Lennon and Paul McCartney, of the Beatles, also cited Broonzy as an important early influence.

While in the Netherlands, Broonzy met and became romantically involved with a Dutch woman, Pim van Isveldt. Together they had a child, Michael, who still lives in Amsterdam.

In 1953, Vera (King) Morkovin and Studs Terkel took Broonzy to Circle Pines Center, a cooperative year-round camp in Delton, Michigan, where he was employed as the summer camp cook. He worked there in the summer from 1953 to 1956. On July 4, 1954, Pete Seeger travelled to Circle Pines and gave a concert with Broonzy on the farmhouse lawn, which was recorded by Seeger for the new fine-arts radio station in Chicago, WFMT-FM.

In 1955, with the assistance of the Belgian writer Yannick Bruynoghe, Broonzy published his autobiography, Big Bill Blues. He toured worldwide, travelling to Africa, South America, the Pacific region and across Europe into early 1956. In 1957 Broonzy was one of the founding faculty members of the Old Town School of Folk Music. On the school's opening night, December 1, he taught a class, "The Glory of Love".

Illness and death
In the late 1940s, Big Bill Broonzy's doctor warned him that 20 years of constant traveling and living the lifestyle of an "itinerant musician" would have dangerous effects on his aging body and health. In June of 1956, Broonzy  began to feel "frazzled", explaining to Pim Van Isveldt that "his nerves might be bad". From 1956 to 1957, as he was performing his last tour in Europe, Broonzy's condition worsened, and he was subsequently diagnosed with cancer in July of 1957. Broonzy made his last recordings from July 12 to 14, 1957 in Chicago.

In September of 1957, Broonzy wrote to Van Isveldt that he recently underwent surgery that removed one of his lungs. Broonzy tried to convince her that he would return to London, but he never toured Europe again. A second surgery that took place in the fall of 1957 ended up severing his vocal cords, and although another operation was planned in the early winter of 1958, in hopes of repairing his damaged vocal cords, Broonzy never performed again.

By 1958, Broonzy was suffering from throat cancer. A benefit concert was organized to assist Broonzy with his medical debt, and the concert ended up raising approximately $2,000. After the two-and-a-half hour performance, Broonzy reportedly stood on stage to thunderous applause, thanking his friends and colleagues for "making the evening so memorable".

On August 14 or 15, 1958 (sources vary on the precise date), Broonzy died in an ambulance from cancer as he was being rushed to Billings Hospital from his home at 4716 South Parkway. His funeral was held on August 19, and he was buried in Lincoln Cemetery, in Blue Island, Illinois.

Style and influence
Broonzy's influences included the folk music, spirituals, work songs, ragtime music, hokum, and country blues he heard growing up and the styles of his contemporaries, including Jimmie Rodgers, Blind Blake, Son House, and Blind Lemon Jefferson. Broonzy combined all these influences into his own style of the blues, which foreshadowed the postwar Chicago blues, later refined and popularized by artists such as Muddy Waters and Willie Dixon.

Although he had been a pioneer of the Chicago blues style and had employed electric instruments as early as 1942, white audiences in the 1950s wanted to hear him playing his earlier songs accompanied only by his own acoustic guitar, which they considered to be more authentic.

He portrayed the discrimination against black Americans in his song "Black, Brown and White". The song has been used globally in education about racism, but in the late 1990s its inclusion in antiracism education at a school in Greater Manchester, England, led pupils to taunt the school's only black pupil with the song's chorus, "If you're white, that's all right, if you're brown, stick around, but if you're black, oh brother get back, get back, get back". The national media reported that the problem became so bad that the nine-year-old boy was withdrawn from the school by his mother. The song had already been adopted by the National Front, a far-right British political party which peaked in popularity in the 1970s and opposed nonwhite immigration to Britain.

A considerable part of Broonzy's early ARC/CBS recordings has been reissued in anthologies by CBS-Sony, and other earlier recordings have been collected on blues reissue labels, as have his European and Chicago recordings of the 1950s. The Smithsonian's Folkways Records has also released several albums featuring Broonzy.

In 1980, he was inducted into the first class of the Blues Hall of Fame, along with 20 other of the world's greatest blues legends. In 2007, he was inducted into the first class of the Gennett Records Walk of Fame, along with 11 other musical greats, including Louis Armstrong, Jelly Roll Morton, Gene Autry, and Lawrence Welk.

Broonzy as an acoustic guitar player inspired Muddy Waters, Memphis Slim, Ray Davies, John Renbourn, Rory Gallagher, Ben Taylor, and Steve Howe.

In the September 2007 issue of Q Magazine, Ronnie Wood, of the Rolling Stones, cited Broonzy's track "Guitar Shuffle" as his favorite guitar music. Wood remarked, "It was one of the first tracks I learnt to play, but even to this day I can't play it exactly right."

Eric Clapton has cited Broonzy as a major inspiration, commenting that Broonzy "became like a role model for me, in terms of how to play the acoustic guitar". Clapton featured Broonzy's song "Hey Hey" on his album Unplugged. The Derek and the Dominos album Layla and Other Assorted Love Songs includes their recording of "Key to the Highway".

Tom Jones has cited Broonzy as a major influence on him and in a 2012 interview described his first experience of Broonzy's music as having been 'Fuck, what is that? Who is that?' Another musician heavily influenced by Broonzy was Jerry Garcia, who upon hearing a recording of Broonzy's blues playing decided to exchange an accordion he received on his 15th birthday for an electric guitar. Garcia would later co-found the  Grateful Dead, who frequently performed a number of songs which Broonzy had recorded decades earlier, including "C.C. Rider" and "Goin' Down the Road Feelin' Bad".

In the benediction at the 2009 inauguration ceremony of President Barack Obama, the civil rights leader Rev. Dr. Joseph Lowery paraphrased Broonzy's song "Black, Brown and White Blues".

As part of the PopUp Archive project, in collaboration with the WFMT network, the Chicago History Museum, and the Library of Congress, an hour-long interview of Broonzy, recorded on September 13, 1955, by Studs Terkel was made available online. The interview includes reflections on his life and on the blues tradition, a performance of one of his most famous songs, "Alberta,"  and performances of "Goin' Down the Road Feelin' Bad" and other classics.

Discography
Between 1927 and 1942, Broonzy recorded 224 songs, which makes him the second most prolific blues recording artist during that period.  These were released before blues records were tracked by recording industry trade magazines. By the time Billboard magazine instituted its "race music" charts in October 1942, Broonzy's recordings were less popular, and none appeared in the charts.

Selected singles
Many of Broonzy's singles were issued by more than one record company, sometimes under different names. Additional versions of some songs were also released. These are marked with a superscript plus sign.

Broonzy also appeared as a sideman on recordings by Lil Green, Sonny Boy Williamson I, Washboard Sam, Jazz Gillum and other Bluebird Records artists.

Albums
 Big Bill Broonzy and Washboard Sam (1953)
 Big Bill Broonzy and Roosevelt Sykes (DVD, recorded 1956)
 His Story (Folkways Records, 1957)
 Big Bill Broonzy Sings Country Blues (Folkways Records FA 2326, 1957)
 Blues with Big Bill Broonzy, Sonny Terry and Brownie McGhee (Folkways Records, 1959)
 Big Bill Broonzy Sings Folk Songs (Folkways Records FA 2328, 1962)
 Big Bill Broonzy Sings Folk Songs (Smithsonian Folkways, 1989) (reissue)
 Best of the Blues Tradition (1991)
 Do That Guitar Rag (1928–1935) (1991)
 Trouble in Mind (Smithsonian Folkways, 2000)
 Broonzy Volume 2: 1945–1949: The Post War Years (2000)
 Big Bill Broonzy in Concert (2002)
 Big Bill Broonzy on Tour in Britain: Live in England & Scotland (2002)
 Big Bill Blues: His 23 Greatest Songs 1927–42 (2004)
 Get Back (2004)
 Big Bill Amsterdam Live Concerts 1953 (2006)
 Keys to the Blues (2009)
 All The Classics 1936-1937, Vol. 4 (2019)

References

Further reading
 Riesman, Bob (2011). I Feel So Good: The Life and Times of Big Bill Broonzy. University of Chicago Press. . See the website for the book.

External links

 Big Bill Broonzy CD reissue discography
 Broonzy.com series of tribute pages including bio, discography, sound clips
 Big Bill Broonzy: Interviews and performances with Studs Terkel at Smithsonian Folkways
 
 Big Bill Broonzy research at the Mississippi Blues Trail
 Big Bill Broonzy recordings at the Discography of American Historical Recordings.

1903 births
1958 deaths
People from Bolivar County, Mississippi
People from Pine Bluff, Arkansas
African-American guitarists
American street performers
American blues guitarists
American male guitarists
Country blues singers
Chicago blues musicians
American folk singers
American male singer-songwriters
American blues singer-songwriters
Folk musicians from Chicago
Old Town School of Folk musicians
Country blues musicians
Singer-songwriters from Arkansas
Singer-songwriters from Mississippi
Deaths from esophageal cancer
Paramount Records artists
Bluebird Records artists
GNP Records artists
Gennett Records artists
Chess Records artists
Vocalion Records artists
Deaths from cancer in Illinois
20th-century African-American male singers
20th-century American guitarists
Singer-songwriters from Illinois
Age controversies
Guitarists from Arkansas
Guitarists from Chicago
Guitarists from Mississippi
Black & Blue Records artists
Folkways Records artists
African-American songwriters
Southland Records artists